CTTS can be an abbreviation for:

 Central Texas Turnpike System
 Circle Takes the Square, an experimental screamo band
 Classical T Tauri Star

See also
 CTSS (disambiguation)